The Ringwall Family (German: Das Geschlecht derer von Ringwall) is a 1918 German silent drama film directed by Rudolf Biebrach and starring Henny Porten, Bruno Decarli and Kurt Vespermann.

The film's sets were designed by the art directors Ludwig Kainer and Jack Winter.

Cast
 Henny Porten as Magdalena von Ringwall 
 Bruno Decarli as Magdalenas Vormund 
 Kurt Vespermann as Argad, Magdalenas Brunder 
 Heinz Burkart as Hans von Sendling 
 Rudolf Biebrach as Der alte Wieland 
 Frida Richard as Die alte Brigitte

References

Bibliography
 Jung, Uli & Schatzberg, Walter. Beyond Caligari: The Films of Robert Wiene. Berghahn Books, 1999.

External links

1918 films
Films of the German Empire
German silent feature films
Films directed by Rudolf Biebrach
German drama films
1918 drama films
UFA GmbH films
German black-and-white films
Silent drama films
1910s German films
1910s German-language films